Annamaria Solazzi (born 10 December 1965) is a former female beach volleyball player from Italy, who twice represented her native country at the Summer Olympics: 1996 and 2000. Partnering Laura Bruschini she thrice claimed the gold medal at the European Championships: in 1997, 1999 and 2000.

Playing partners
 Laura Bruschini
 Gaia Cicola
 Giseli Gavio
 Daniela Gioria
 Nicoletta Luciani
 Diletta Lunardi
 Consuelo Turetta

References

External links
 
 
 

1965 births
Living people
Italian beach volleyball players
Beach volleyball players at the 1996 Summer Olympics
Beach volleyball players at the 2000 Summer Olympics
Olympic beach volleyball players of Italy
Sportspeople from Ancona
Women's beach volleyball players